One of the Missing is a 1968 short film written and directed by Tony Scott. The film is set during the American Civil War and is based on Ambrose Bierce's short story of the same name.

References

External links 
 

1968 films
American Civil War films
British short films
British war films
Films directed by Tony Scott
1960s English-language films
1960s American films
1960s British films